Labna (or Labná in Spanish orthography)  is a Mesoamerican archaeological site and ceremonial center of the pre-Columbian Maya civilization, located in the Puuc Hills region of the Yucatán Peninsula. It is situated to the south of the large Maya site of Uxmal, in the southwest of the present-day state of Yucatán, Mexico. It was incorporated with Uxmal as a UNESCO World Heritage Site in 1996.

The site is a comparatively small and compact one. Among its notable structures is a large two-storey 'palace' ("El Palacio"), which is one of the longest contiguous structures in the Puuc region at approximately 120 m (393.7 ft) in length. From the palace, a ceremonial road (sacbe) extends to an elaborately decorated gateway arch ("El Arco"). This structure is 3 m (9.8 ft) wide and 6 m high, with well-reserved bas-reliefs. The arch is not an entrance to the city, but rather is a passageway between public areas.  Next to this gateway stands "El Mirador", a pyramid-like structure surmounted by a temple. Also on the site is the Temple of the Columns.

The structural design and motifs of the site's buildings are in the Maya architecture regional style known as Puuc. This makes extensive use of well-cut stone forming patterns and depictions, including masks of the long-nosed rain-god Chaac.

The site was built in the Late and Terminal Classic era. A date corresponding to AD 862 is inscribed in the palace.

The first written report of Labna was by John Lloyd Stephens who visited it with artist Frederick Catherwood in 1842.

The site is open to visitors.

As the relations between India and Mexico are warming up, India has recently unveiled a replica of the Arch at Garden of Five Senses, New Delhi as a goodwill gesture .

References

External links
Labna-Kiuic Regional Archaeological Project
Labná web site at Reed College. Over 300 19th - 21st century photographs of Labná.
.

Maya sites in Yucatán
Maya Classic Period
Tourist attractions in Yucatán